Bundesstraße 111 (abbreviated B 111) begins at the A 20 motorway (Autobahn) near Gützkow and ends at the B 110 near Mellenthin in northeast Germany. Since January 2008 the Bundesstraße 111 has followed the course of the old state road (Landesstraße) L 265 (Schmollensee-Pudagla-Mellenthin). Previously the route of the B 111 ran to the Polish border on the island of Usedom in the seaside resort village of Ahlbeck in the parish of Heringsdorf.

Route / Junctions 

111
B 111